buw or BUW may refer to:
 buw Holding (German company)
 Warsaw University Library (Biblioteka Uniwersytecka w Warszawie)
 BUW, the IATA code for Baubau Airport, Indonesia
 Boat Under Weight - used in the sport of rowing
 University of Wuppertal (Bergische Universität Wuppertal), Germany